Small Town Conspiracy or formally known as Florida City is an independent feature film shot in 2003 in Orlando, Florida. The movie is based on a true story that took place in 1941 in a small city outside of Miami. The film stars Zen Gesner as Chief of Police John Haleran who is conducting a murder investigation.

The movie was shot in Center Hill, Florida and Winter Garden, Florida (towns near Orlando, Florida) and was directed by Ralph Clemente. Clemente was a very well known person in the filming industry as director/producer and also known for being the Program Director at the Valencia Community College Film Production Technology Program at Orlando, Florida, "one of the best film schools in the country" as stated by Steven Spielberg.

Cast 
 Zen Gesner as John Haleran
 Jeannetta Arnette as Donna Jo
 William Morgan Sheppard as Taylor
 James Bates, Jr. as Andy Creed
 Patrick Cherry as Tector
 Brett Rice as Doc DeLibo
 Talia Osteen as Sarah 
 Patrick Holland as James Wilson 
 Tom Schuster as One-eyed Man
 George Steele as Tortuga Jack

References

External links 
 

American independent films
2003 films
Films set in Florida
Films shot in Florida
2000s English-language films
2000s American films